The Gyeongchun Line is a regional rail line between Seoul and Chuncheon, South Korea, operated by Korail. Its name is derived from Gyeong (meaning the capital, Seoul) and Chuncheon. It was completely reconstructed in the 2000s. Service on it has operated between Sangbong station on the Jungang Line in eastern Seoul and Chuncheon station, as part of the Seoul Metropolitan Subway system, since December 21, 2010. A class of regional rail service named ITX-Cheongchun began operations on February 28, 2012, linking Chuncheon to Cheongnyangni and Yongsan Stations.

History 
Chuncheon was the most popular destination for students on orientation trips, bringing passengers to the line. Following the Liberation of Korea, all railways, including the Gyeongchun Railway, were nationalised.

Upgrade 

Between Geumgok and Chuncheon, from 1997 until 2010, the line was re-laid in a straighter, 64.2 km long alignment with a budget of 2.151,931 billion won. The remaining 17.9 km of the upgraded line was built with a separate budget of 574.124 billion won. Towards Seoul, after Toegyewon station, this section of the new line diverges from the old alignment that ended in Seongbuk, and connects to the Jungang Line at Mangu station.

The new alignment was originally planned to be opened in 2004, but completion of the works was delayed for various reasons, including lack of funds. The complete new alignment opened and the old one closed on December 21, 2010.

On September 1, 2010, the South Korean government announced a strategic plan to reduce travel times from Seoul to 95% of the country to under 2 hours by 2020. As part of the plan, the Gyeongchun Line is to be further upgraded for 230 km/h and may see KTX service. For the longer term, the government also considers to build a parallel high-speed line that would continue beyond Chuncheon to Sokcho on South Korea's east coast.

On November 4, 2016, two trains (one in the morning, one in the night) were added to the line. These trains run to and from Kwangwoon University station, allowing for transfers to Line 1. These train take Mangu Line Branch.

On September 26, 2016, the service was extended to Cheongnyangni station to improve access to regional trains at the station. However, only 10 trains in each direction travel past Sangbong Station; the majority of the trains still terminate at Sangbong Station, and the two special rush-hour trains still run to and from Kwangwoon University Station.

Services

Seoul Metropolitan Subway Gyeongchun Line 

When the new Gyeongchun Line was opened on December 21, 2010, passenger service was integrated into the Seoul Metropolitan Subway system as a name of Seoul Metropolitan Subway Gyeongchun Line (수도권 전철 경춘선). It brings that the system from Seoul all the way into Gangwon-do. The new service reduced travel time between Chuncheon and Sangbong in Seoul from two hours to 89 minutes, with different trains operating according to different stopping patterns; and increased capacity five-fold. Compared to the previous Mugunghwa-ho train service on the Gyeongchun Line, fares were reduced by half. For the service, Hyundai Rotem supplied Korail with fifteen eight-car Class 361000 EMU trains, out of which only fourteen trains remain in service on the line today.

Currently, Seoul Metropolitan Subway Gyeongchun Line serves mainly Sangbong station to Chuncheon station. Rare service to Cheongnyangni or Kwangwoon University station is also available making Y-shaped line.

ITX-Cheongchun service
On February 28, 2012, Korail introduced the ITX-Cheongchun service (Intercity Train EXpress), which uses Class 368000 trains with double-deck cars. The base fare is 9,800 won between Chuncheon and Yongsan, but Korail offers 15% discount at all time resulting price of 8,300 won. Basic discount rate was 30% until July 31, 2016, 25% until July 31, 2018, 15% since August 1, 2018.

Mugunghwa service 
Some special Mugunghwa trains which deploy military troops takes Gyeongchun Line.

Service Route

Current Services

Main Line 
The following stations are along the Gyeongui-Jungang Line and the Gyeongchun Line itself.

The negative sign is only a convention for distance notation from Sangbong Station, the terminus of most services.

Mangu Line Branch (very limited service)

Former alignment

See also 

 Korail
 Transportation in South Korea

References

 
Railway lines in South Korea
Railway lines opened in 1939
Transport in Seoul
Transport in Gyeonggi Province
Transport in Gangwon Province, South Korea
Seoul Metropolitan Subway lines